The National Federation of Federal Employees (NFFE) is an American labor union which represents about 100,000 public employees in the federal government.

NFFE has about 200 local unions, most of them agency-wide bargaining units. Its members work primarily in the Department of Defense, the Forest Service, the Department of Veterans Affairs, the General Services Administration, the National Park Service, the Army Corps of Engineers, the Department of Housing and Urban Development, and the Passport Services division of the Bureau of Consular Affairs (Department of State).

Formation
Workers in federal agencies had formed craft-based unions on the local level beginning in the early 1880s. Unions representing letter carriers and railway postal clerks won passage in 1888 of federal legislation mandating an eight-hour day for postal workers. In 1898, these two unions—with the support of the Knights of Labor and the American Federation of Labor—pushed for legislation revising federal postal salaries as well. Although the effort was unsuccessful, a union of postal clerks organized in 1900.<ref name="Mayers">Mayers, The Federal Service...''', 1922.</ref>

The growing power of these and other unions in the federal government led President Theodore Roosevelt to issue Executive order 163 on January 31, 1902, banning federal workers from "individually or through associations, [soliciting] an increase of pay, or to influence or to attempt to influence in their own interest any legislation whatever, either before Congress or its Committees, or in any way save through the heads of the Departments in or under which they serve, on penalty of dismissal from the government service." This Executive Order was expanded by Roosevelt on January 26, 1906, to include the independent agencies as well. On November 26, 1908, Roosevelt dramatically widened the extent of the Executive Order to include military personnel, expanded the kind of information which could not be communicated, and banned other actions by employees.

Under Congressional pressure, President William H. Taft made the Executive Order less onerous.  On April 8, 1912, Taft amended the order to permit federal workers to communicate with Congress, but required them to do so through their supervisors and department heads.

Unhappy with Taft's refusal to rescind the order entirely, Congress passed the Lloyd-La Follette Act (§6) on August 24, 1912, declaring that "the right of persons employed in the civil service of the United States, either individually or collectively, to petition Congress or any member thereof or to furnish information to either House of Congress or to any committee thereof, shall not be denied or interfered with."

The Lloyd-La Follette Act provided a significant impetus to the formation federal employees' unions.  In 1916, the American Federation of Labor (AFL) acted to bring the various local unions together to form a single national union. The National Federation of Federal Employees was founded in Washington, D.C., on September 17, 1917. In 1918, it became the first labor union to win the legal right to represent federal workers.

History

NFFE grew quickly.  For example, by 1929 it had organized more than 1,500 workers at the Bureau of Engraving and Printing. The unit was the largest NFFE chapter in the country, the largest local union in the country, and the largest women's union in the country. NFFE also quickly abandoned its craft focus. Some local chapters—especially those in large federal agencies in Washington, D.C., where the number of workers enabled craft-based bargaining units to remain viable—retained their craft structure. But most of the union's units throughout the country became industrial unions. Even many of the D.C.-area unions abandoned their craft orientation to become industrial unions with agency-wide bargaining units.

The significance of the Bureau of Engraving and Printing local was not lost on NFFE. NFFE became a strong advocate for women's rights, and elected a woman, Florence Etheridge, as the chair of its first national council.

NFFE relied heavily on the provisions of the Lloyd–La Follette Act as the basis for its operations. Much of the union's focus was on legislative action. For example, it began advocating for a formal federal job classification system and uniform rates of compensation in 1919. These efforts paid off: The same year, Congress established the Joint Congressional Committee on the Reclassification of Salaries. In 1923, NFFE won passage of the Classification Act, which established uniform, nationwide compensation levels and tied them to the duties and responsibilities of job positions.

In 1931, NFFE disaffiliated from the American Federation of Labor. The break occurred over the AFL's refusal to abandon its support for craft unionism and cease its attacks on industrial unions. NFFE disaffiliated in December 1931. The AFL responded by chartering a new federal employees union, the American Federation of Government Employees (AFGE), on October 17, 1932.

In 1962, President John F. Kennedy signed Executive Order 10988, establishing the right of federal workers to engage in collective bargaining. Consequently, union membership among U.S. government employees soared from 13 percent in 1961 to 60 percent in the 1974. NFFE's membership also grew tremendously, roughly doubling during the same period from 80,000 members to 150,000 members.

In 1963, NFFE was one of the foremost proponents of the Equal Pay Act.

NFFE became embroiled in a major legal fight with the Reagan administration. In August 1987, the Reagan administration issued civil service rules requiring all federal workers to sign a new secrecy pledge, Standard Form 189.  Administration officials said the new form was designed merely to reinforce the need to maintain the security of those documents classified as top secret.  But NFFE filed a lawsuit on August 17, 1987, challenging the constitutionality of the secrecy pledge. In May 1988, a U.S. District Court ruled in National Federation of Federal Employees v. United States (688 F. Supp. 671) that Standard Form 189 was constitutional. The NFFE and other plaintiffs appealed to the U.S. Supreme Court. In July 1988, the District Court further held in National Federation of Federal Employees v. United States (695 F. Supp. 1196) that certain terms in Standard Form 189 needed additional clarification by the executive branch. NFFE appealed this ruling to the U.S. Court of Appeals for the District of Columbia Circuit. Meanwhile, in September 1988, the federal government issued Standard Form 312 as a replacement for Standard Form 189. The new form expunged much of the objectionable language which had so deeply concerned NFFE and other unions. On April 18, 1989, the Supreme Court held in American Foreign Service Association v. Garfinkel, 490 U.S. 153, that the issuance of Standard Form 312 may have resolved the conflict. The Supreme Court remanded the case back to the District Court to resolve any outstanding issues. The Court of Appeals for the District of Columbia Circuit also remanded the second NFFE lawsuit to District Court. In March 1990, the District Court dismissed the remaining issues in its ruling in American Foreign Service Association v. Garfinkel, 732 F. Supp. 13), and NFFE dropped any further attempts to revive the suit.

Membership losses and affiliation
By 1989, NFFE—once the second-largest union representing federal workers—had shed nearly three-quarters of its members.  The American Federation of Government Employees now had 180,000 dues-paying members, the International Association of Machinists 100,000 dues-paying members, the National Treasury Employees Union 65,000 dues-paying members, and the National Association of Government Employees (a division of the Service Employees International Union) 50,000 dues-paying members. The National Federation of Federal Employees, however, had just 45,000 dues-paying members.The focus on dues-paying members is important under U.S. federal law. The closed shop and union shop are banned under labor relations laws and regulations governing federal workers. A union which represents a unit of workers must represent all the workers, whether they pay dues or not.  Most federal workers' unions have substantial numbers of non-dues-paying members who nonetheless must receive services from the union. For comparison, in 1989, the American Federation of Government Employees had 180,000 dues-paying members but was forced to represent 700,000 employees. NFFE had 45,000 and 152,000 members, respectively; the National Treasury Employees Union 65,000 and 146,000. Such large numbers of non-dues-paying members can significantly drain a union's resources. See: Levitan and Gallo, "Can Employee Associations Negotiate New Growth?", Monthly Labor Review, July 1989. Much of NFFE's membership losses had come through significant downsizing of the blue-collar federal workforce where NFFE's membership was concentrated. NFFE also lost a large number of members due to raiding.  The American Federation of Government Employees was particularly aggressive in courting NFFE members and convincing them to switch their union affiliation.

Such raids eventually drove NFFE to re-affiliate with the AFL–CIO. In 1998, AFGE began an organizing drive among 2,600 physicians, nurses and dentists working for the Veterans Health Administration in the U.S. Department of Veterans' Affairs. The workers were already represented by NFFE, and constituted more than 85 percent of NFFE's membership in the VA health system. As NFFE's voting strength among the workers weakened, the national union's leaders sought to end the raid by affiliating with the AFL–CIO. The AFL–CIO declined to issue a charter, but agreed to readmit the union if it affiliated with an existing AFL–CIO member. The NFFE executive council subsequently agreed to affiliate the union with the International Association of Machinists (IAM). The IAM claimed to represent more than 100,000 federal workers, making it the second-largest union of federal workers. The affiliation did not help, however. Because the organizing dispute began prior to NFFE's affiliation with IAM, the AFL–CIO ruled that the election could go ahead. Although IAM devoted significant resources to the organizing battle, the Machinists' expertise was in the construction and aerospace fields, not health care.  After a year-long campaign, AFGE convinced a majority of the VA employees to switch their affiliation in 2000.

Recent issues
The IAM affiliation, however, helped to significantly strength NFFE in the longer term.  New raids on NFFE membership no longer occurred, and the union's administrative and financial resources greatly improved.  NFFE is now considered "a key player in backing collective bargaining and appeal rights of [federal] employees." As of 2007, NFFE represented about 100,000 federal workers.

More recently, NFFE waged a lengthy legal battle against the U.S. Department of Defense's new National Security Personnel System. NFFE won several significant rulings in the legal fight but did not prevent the system's implementation, and the union began to pursue legislative remedies in Congress instead.

The union also opposed the Iraq Study Group's recommendation that the Bush administration force government civilians to serve in Iraq.

Death of Richard Brown
NFFE President Richard N. Brown died unexpectedly at his home in Arlington, Virginia, at the age of 47 on June 30, 2009.  William Dougan, the union's Secretary-Treasurer, was automatically elevated to the position of President to serve out the rest of Brown's term (which expired in 2012); Dougan was subsequently elected to a full four-year term in his own right.

Presidents
Howard Marion McLarin, September 24, 1917 – June 30, 1918
Luther Corwin Steward, September 1, 1918 – August 19, 1955
Michael E. Markwood, September 1, 1955 – January 27, 1957
Vaux Owen, January 29, 1957 – September 30, 1964
Nathan Tully Wolkomir, October 1, 1964 – October 31, 1976
James Monroe Peirce, Jr., November 1, 1976 – October 31, 1990
Sheila K. Velazco, November 1, 1990 – October 31, 1992
Robert Scott Keener, November 1, 1992 – January 2, 1994
Sheila K. Velazco, January 3, 1994 – October 31, 1994
Louis Jasmine, November 1, 1994 – September 8, 1995
Sonya Constaine, September 9, 1995 – October 1, 1995
Robert Eugene Estep, Jr., October 2, 1995 – May 2, 1996
Gary Wayne Divine, May 3, 1996 – October 31, 1996
James Doyle Cunningham, November 1, 1996 – February 21, 1998
Albert Schmidt, February 22, 1998 – October 31, 1998
Richard N. Brown, November 1, 1998 – June 30, 2009 (deceased)
William Dougan, July 1, 2009 – 2016
Randy L. Erwin, December 1, 2016 – present

See also
 United Public Workers of America
 American Federation of Government Employees

Notes

References
Ballard, Tanya. "AFGE Wins Election to Represent Veterans Affairs Workers." Government Executive. March 14, 2001.
Ballenstedt, Brittany R. "First Civil Service Union Celebrates 90 Years." Government Executive. September 17, 2007.
Executive Order 163, January 31, 1902. John T. Woolley and Gerhard Peters. The American Presidency Project. Santa Barbara, CA: University of California (hosted), Gerhard Peters (database). Accessed November 3, 2007.
Foner, Philip S. History of the Labor Movement in the United States. Vol. 9: The T.U.E.L. to the End of the Gompers Era. New York: International Publishers, 1991. Cloth ; Paperback 
Friedman, Daniel. "Unions Oppose 'Draft' of Federal Workers to Iraq." Federal Times. December 8, 2006.
Information Security Oversight Office.  Executive Office of the President. 1990 Report to the President. Washington, D.C.: Information Security Oversight Office, 1990.
Johnson, Ronald N. and Libecap, Gary D. The Federal Civil Service System and the Problem of Bureaucracy: The Economics and Politics of Institutional Change. Chicago: University of Chicago Press, 1994. 
"Labor Suit Widens Drive on Secrecy Pledge." Associated Press. September 3, 1987.
Levitan, Sar A. and Gallo, Frank. "Can Employee Associations Negotiate New Growth?" Monthly Labor Review. July 1989.
Masters, Marick F. "Federal-Sector Unions: Current Status and Future Directions." Journal of Labor Research. 25:1 (March 2004).
Mayers, Lewis.  The Federal Service: A Study of the System of Personnel Administration in the Federal Government. New York: D. Appleton and Co., 1922.
Pueschel, Matt. "Unionization Continues to Grow in Agencies." U.S. Medicine. March 2006.
Rutzick, Karen. "Union Rally." Government Executive''. February 1, 2007.

External links

National Federation of Federal Employees. Southern Labor Archives, Georgia State University Library.

Civil service trade unions
International Association of Machinists and Aerospace Workers
1917 establishments in the United States
Trade unions established in 1917